Vasili Vyacheslavovich Blagov (29 October 1954 − 9 May 2019) was a Russian pair skater who competed for the Soviet Union. With partner Irina Cherniaeva, he represented the Soviet Union at the 1972 Winter Olympics where they placed 6th. 

He later competed with Natalia Dongauzer (Pavlova), winning the silver medal at the 1973 Prize of Moscow News.

Competitive highlights
(with Cherniaeva)

(with Dongauzer)

References

Navigation

1954 births
2019 deaths
Russian male pair skaters
Soviet male pair skaters
Olympic figure skaters of the Soviet Union
Figure skaters at the 1972 Winter Olympics
Figure skaters from Moscow